Hawassa University (HU) is a residential national university in Hawassa, Sidama Region, Ethiopia. The Ministry of Science and Higher Education admits qualified students to Hawassa University based on their score on the Ethiopian Higher Education Entrance Examination (EHEEE).

History
The origin of Hawassa University was the establishment of Debub University ("Southern" University) on 22 December 1998 via a government proclamation. Debub University originally consisted of Awassa College of Agriculture, Wondo Genet College of Forestry, and Dila Teachers' Education and Health Science College.

Debub University was renamed Hawassa University on 17 February 2006.

Hawassa University was reestablished on 23 May 2011.

Academics
HU offers 81 undergraduate programs, 108 Masters programs, and 16 PhD programs. In March 2018, the student population was 48,558.

HU operates seven campuses.
Hawassa College of Agriculture
College of Law and Governance
College of Social Sciences and Humanities
College of Natural and Computational Sciences 
College of Business and Economics
College of Medicine and Health Science
Wondo Genet College of Forestry and Natural Resources
Institute of Technology
College  Of Education
School of Graduate Studies
School of Continuing Education

Notable alumni 

 Samuel Urkato, Minister of Science and Higher Education and was student of the university.
 Fryat Yemane, actress, television host and model, was a student at the university.
 Fitsum Assefa, Ethiopia Minister of Planning and Development Commission, taught at the university.

References

Universities and colleges in Ethiopia
Educational institutions established in 1999
1999 establishments in Ethiopia
Sidama Region